San Lorenzo is a church building in the sestiere of Castello of Venice, northern Italy.

The church dates to the 9th century, and became attached to the neighboring Benedictine monastery. It was rebuilt in 1580-1616 to designs by Simone Sorela. The high altar was partly sculpted by Giovanni Maria da Cannaregio using designs by Girolamo Campagna. The latter sculptor completed the statues of Saints Lawrence and Sebastian. Marco Polo was buried there, per his request on his deathbed. 

Saint Paul I of Constantinople relics were removed to Venice in 1226, since then they are kept with great respect in the church of St. Laurence. 

Roman Catholic churches completed in 1616
Lorenzo Venice
Lorenzo
Baroque architecture in Venice
9th-century establishments in Italy
1616 establishments in Italy